The county of the Bakony was a royal land in the Kingdom of Hungary in the Bakony forest formed in the 12th century. Originally it had no castles or significant population, neither were there bigger donations. In the 15th century it merged into Veszprém county.

References

Sources 

Counties in the Kingdom of Hungary